Donald Stevenson (April 12, 1833 - 1908) was a cattleman and politician in North Dakota, US. A state assemblyman, he was also the first elected Emmons County treasurer.

Early years
He was born in the Scottish Highlands, came to Canada in 1833, was educated in the common schools of that country, and settled in Douglas County, Minnesota.

Career
Stevenson came to the Red River Valley long in advance of any of the settlements, excepting that at Pembina and Walhallalong before Bismarck, Fargo, Wahpeton or Grand Forks had any inhabitants. He was at Pembina in 1863, engaged as an army freighter in charge of a train of 300 wagons with supplies for Hatch's battalion. The old ox yokes and chains found by early settlers in Ransom County were remains of his train, lost in freighting to old Fort Ransom in 1868.

He was an army contractor at old Fort Abercrombie and located at Bismarck in 1872, engaging in contracting at Fort Rice, Fort Abraham Lincoln, Fort Stevenson and Ford Berthold, and also at Fort Keogh, Fort Custer, Fort Buford and other points in the Northwest, long before the days of railroad extensions. In 1877, he put in 3,800 tons of hay at Fort Keogh in 64 days at $28 per ton. His hay and wood contracts at that time amounted to US$104,000. In 1876, he was engaged in freighting to the Black Hills and arrived at Big Meadow just after Billy Budge's battle with the Sioux. Retiring from contracting and freighting, Stevenson became a cattle grower, having a herd of several hundred cattle west of the Missouri, southwest of Mandan. In 1806, was appointed postmaster at Osakis, Minnesota by Abraham Lincoln, was county commissioner for seven years in Douglas county, and two years in Emmons County, North Dakota, and then served as postmaster. He was a member of the 1897 North Dakota Legislative Assembly.

He was inducted into the North Dakota Cowboy Hall of Fame in 2007.

References

Members of the North Dakota House of Representatives
1833 births
1908 deaths
County treasurers in the United States
Scottish emigrants to pre-Confederation Canada
Pre-Confederation Canadian emigrants to the United States
People from Douglas County, Minnesota
People from Emmons County, North Dakota
County commissioners in Minnesota
19th-century American politicians
American people of Scottish descent
Minnesota postmasters
County commissioners in North Dakota
North Dakota postmasters